Mark O'Rowe is an Irish playwright and screenwriter.

Life 
Mark O'Rowe was born in 1970 in Dublin, Ireland, to parents Hugh and Patricia O'Rowe (to whom he dedicated his 1999 play, Howie the Rookie). He grew up in Tallaght, a working class suburb in the west of Dublin, and he claims that much of the violence in his work stems from watching and rewatching a tremendous amount of violent, bloody movies when he was in his teens.

List of plays 

 The Approach (2018)
 Our Few and Evil Days (2014)
 Terminus (2007)
 Howie the Rookie (1999)
 The Aspidistra Code (1995)
 Anna's Ankle
 From Both Hips
 Crestfall
 Made in China

Credits as a screenwriter 
 Intermission
 Perrier's Bounty
 Boy A
 Broken
 The Delinquent Season
 Normal People (TV series)

Awards and nominations

As a playwright 
 Irish Times/ESB Theatre Award for Best New Play for Howie the Rookie.
 George Devine Award for Best New Play for Howie The Rookie.
 Rooney Prize for Irish Literature for Howie the Rookie in 1999.

As a screenwriter 
 He won the IFTA Award for the Best Screenplay in 2003 for Intermission

References

External links 

Mark O'Rowe's Literary Encyclopedia Entry

1970 births
Living people
Irish dramatists and playwrights
Irish male dramatists and playwrights
Irish screenwriters
Irish male screenwriters